Falling in Love Again is the second studio album by the American singer-songwriter Davitt Sigerson. It was originally released in 1984 on the record label, ZE worldwide.

Track listing
All tracks composed and arranged by Davitt Sigerson
"Over and Over"
"Jones"
"Danish Modern"
"Another Day Another Doll"
"My True Feelings"
"Once You've Been There"
"Half Life"
"Divorce"
"Activate"

Personnel
Davitt Sigerson - vocals
Mike Sheppard - bass, guitar
Rick Stevenson - synthesizer programming
Bob Thiele, Jr. - additional vocals and keyboards
Anna Fell - bass viol
David Young - additional guitar
Bob Riley, Preston Heyman - additional drums
Amy Kanter, Elaine Caswell - additional vocals
Technical
Carl Beatty, Mike Sheppard - engineer
Tom Wilkes - design

References

1984 albums
ZE Records albums